Beach and Stockton station is a streetcar station in San Francisco, California, serving the San Francisco Municipal Railway's E Embarcadero and F Market & Wharves heritage railway lines. It is located on Beach Street at Stockton Street, near the Pier 39 shopping center and tourist attraction. The station opened on March 4, 2000, with the streetcar's extension to Fisherman's Wharf.

The stop is served by the  bus route, which provides service along the F Market & Wharves and L Taraval lines during the late night hours when trains do not operate.

References

External links 

SFMTA: Beach St & Stockton St
SFBay Transit (unofficial): Beach St & Stockton St

Stockton
Railway stations in the United States opened in 2000